Cauliflower is a type of vegetable.

Cauliflower may also refer to:

Cauliflower ear, a condition of the ear
Cauliflower nose, large, bulbous, ruddy appearance of the nose caused by granulomatous infiltration
Cauliflower Hakea, a shrub which is endemic to the south-west of Western Australia
Cauliflower mushroom, a genus of parasitic mushrooms characterised by cauliflower-like appearance
Cauliflower cheese, a British dish based on cauliflower
A 0-6-0 London and North Western Railway goods locomotive class, known as Cauliflowers, designed by Francis Webb
Cauliflower (film), a 2021 Telugu spoof film

See also 
 Cauliflory, in botany